Elena Aniushina (born 8 December 1993) is a Russian sprint canoeist. She competed in the women's K-2 500 metres event at the 2016 Summer Olympics.

References

External links
 

1993 births
Living people
Russian female canoeists
Olympic canoeists of Russia
Canoeists at the 2016 Summer Olympics
Canoeists at the 2015 European Games
European Games competitors for Russia
ICF Canoe Sprint World Championships medalists in kayak
21st-century Russian women